The Lecanoromycetidae are a subclass of fungi in the class Lecanoromycetes. This subclass contains five orders: the Caliciales , the Lecanorales , the Lecideales , the Leprocaulales , the Peltigerales , the Rhizocarpales , and the Teloschistales .

References

Lecanoromycetes
Lichen subclasses
Fungus subclasses
Taxa described in 2007